Binkoç is a village in the Erzincan District of Erzincan Province in Turkey. It had a population of 222 in 2021.

The hamlet of Memetalibey is attached to the village.

References

Villages in Erzincan District